The Saint Joseph's Hawks baseball team is a varsity intercollegiate athletic team of Saint Joseph's University in Philadelphia, Pennsylvania, United States. The team is a member of the Atlantic 10 Conference, which is part of the National Collegiate Athletic Association's Division I. Saint Joseph's first baseball team was fielded in 1894. The team plays its home games at John W. Smithson Field on the campus of Saint Joseph's University. The Hawks previously played at Campbell's Field in Camden, New Jersey before the completion of Smithson Field in 2012. The Hawks are coached by Fritz Hamburg.

See also
List of NCAA Division I baseball programs

References

External links
 

 
Baseball teams established in 1894
1894 establishments in Pennsylvania